is a Japanese-registered whale catcher that undertakes whaling operations in the North Pacific Ocean and Southern Ocean.  Along with other vessels of the Japanese whaling fleet she has been featured on American television, in the documentary-style reality series Whale Wars.

Yūshin Maru No. 3 was built in 2007 and replaced the Kyo Maru No. 1, which was later preserved as a museum ship in Taiji, Japan.

See also
 Whaling in Japan
 Institute of Cetacean Research

References

Whaling ships
Whaling in Japan
2007 ships
Ships built in Japan